</ref>
| founded =  
| ground = Estadio Óscar Quiteño
| capacity = 17,500
| coach = Octavio Zambrano 
| league = Primera División
| season = 2022 Apertura
| position = Overall: 2nd Group B  Playoffs: Champions
| website = https://www.cdeportivofas.com
| pattern_la1 = _cska2021h
| pattern_b1 = _cska2021h
| pattern_ra1 = _cska2021h
| pattern_sh1 = _cska2021h
| pattern_so1 = _socks
| leftarm1 = 12357E
| body1 = 12357E
| rightarm1 = 12357E
| shorts1 = 12357E
| socks1 = 12357E
| pattern_la2 = _stmirren2122a
| pattern_b2 = _stmirren2122a
| pattern_ra2 = _stmirren2122a
| pattern_sh2 = 
| pattern_so2 = 
| leftarm2 = FF0000
| body2 = FF0000
| rightarm2 = FF0000
| shorts2 = FF0000
| socks2 = FF0000
}}

Club Deportivo Futbolistas Asociados Santanecos, commonly known as FAS (pronounced "fas"), is a professional Salvadoran football club based in Santa Ana.

It competes in Primera División de Fútbol de El Salvador, the country's top professional league. The team's nickname is Los Tigres (The Tigers). FAS was founded on 16 February 1947. The team plays its home games at the Estadio Óscar Quiteño, the third largest stadium in El Salvador.

The club has a long-standing rivalry with Águila and Alianza, and are the only three clubs to never have been relegated to the Second Division. Matches between them are known as Clásicos. FAS also plays a local derby against Isidro Metapán.

FAS is the most successful club in El Salvador football with the highest fan base. Domestically, the club has won a record nineteen national league titles. In international competitions, FAS have one FIFA recognized club trophies, tied with Alianza and Águila as the only club to achieve it. They have won one CONCACAF Champions' Cup/Champions League trophies, and finished runners up in the 1979 Copa Interamericana cup, and third place in the 1980 Copa Interclubes UNCAF.

History

The Beginning
Clubs from San Salvador had dominated Salvadoran football for many years.  The municipal mayor of the Santa Ana district, Manuel Tomás Monedero, wanted to create a team from Santa Ana to end the dominance of the San Salvador clubs. Together with the help of Santa Ana mayor Waldo Rey, Monedero organized the union of all the clubs in Santa Ana (including Unión, Colegio Salesiano San José, Cosmos, RAL, Colón, Santa Lucía and Los 44).

On 16 February 1947, these teams united to form Futbolistas Asociados Santanecos, or FAS for short.  Samuel Zaldaña Galdámez was named the club first president. It was originally proposed that the club should wear yellow and black, but Monedero settled on the more traditional choice of red and blue.

The First Steps
The club played its first match on 26 March 1947 against the previous year's champion Libertad FC at the Finca Modelo (which would be their home stadium for many years).  The club's founding players were Juan Moreno and Óscar González, Goalkeeper; Tomás Morán, Jorge Brito and Guillermo Herrera, defenders; Manuel Padilla, Lino Medina, Moisés Jovel, Antonio Pérez and Eliseo Ramos, midfielders; Víctor Castro, Tomás Angulo, Antonio Mancía, Antonio Azucena, Mario (Capellan) y Jose (El Torro) González, strikers.  Armando Chacón was the manager.  The first match ended in a 4–1 defeat.

Early History (1948–1959)
In 1948–49, FAS moved into the First Division for the first time, and have remained their ever since.  Chacón was still the manager, and the team began on a winning note by defeating Juventud Olimpica 2–1. They recorded two more wins over Dragón and Santa Anita (3–0, 3–2 respectively) before losing 3–1 to Cusatleco.  FAS would ultimately finish 3rd behind Libertad FC and champion Once Municipal.

In 1951–52, FAS won their first title.  The manager was Victor Manuel "Pipe" Ochoa, who proceeded to lead the club to a second title in 1953–54.  During the 1956–57 season, the club came close to relegation, which caused the owners to hire Argentinian coach Alberto Cevasco and bring in the reinforcements of foreign players, including Omar Muraco, Javier Novello, Héctor Marinaro, Héctor Dadeiro and Miguelito Álvarez.  This move led the club to a third title in 1958–59.

1960–1992
In 1961–62, César Viccinio managed the team to its fourth title, while Raul Miralles led the team to another in 1962.  At the beginning of the 1963, the club moved its headquarters to the newly built Estadio Santaneco.

The early history of that stadium was marked by tragedy, as goalkeeper Oscar Quiteño collapsed during a friendly match against Orión F.C.  Efforts to revive him failed, and Quiteño died on the pitch.  In his honor, the club renamed the stadium to Estadio Quiteño and wore black uniforms for two years.

Fans came to believe the club was cursed, as Quiteño's death was followed by a fifteen-year title drought.  Adding to that frustration was that the club reached the finals in 1965, 1968, and 1969 and meet defeat all three times.  Their tormentor was Alianza, known at that time as the "Orquestra Alba" for their harmony and skill.

FAS did break that curse with titles in 1977–78, 1978–79, 1981, and 1984.  In addition, they won the 1979 CONCACAF Champions League by beating The key to that run was forward Jorge "Mágico" González.  Widely considered the greatest player in Salvadoran history, Gonzalez was at FAS from 1977 to 1982, and at that time was nicknamed Mago.  After the 1982 season, he left El Salvador for Spain and La Liga, playing at Cadiz, Barcelona, and Valladolid.

However, a title drought of ten more years followed.

1993–1994

In 1993, that drought led to the appointment of a new board of directors.  The new board's first move was to hired Uruguayan coach Saúl Rivero, as well as a host of experienced players from both Uruguay and El Salvador.  The board also placed a new emphasis on youth leagues.  Finally, they purchased lights for the stadium, making night games possible.  FAS proceeded to win titles in 1994-95 and 1995–96, beating Luis Ángel Firpo in both seasons.  Part of the key to this run was the return of Jorge "Mágico" González and the addition of Hugo Pérez.

2000s
FAS became the most dominant team in the beginning of the century, winning six titles between 2002 and 2006, this success came under the tenureship of Peruvian Agustin Castillo

The century would start off with mild success with FAS reaching the 2000 Clausura semi final before losing to runners up ADET and this was followed by missing the finals altogether in the 2000 Apetura, marking the worst performance under the Clausura/Apertura format for FAS.

For the 2001 Clausura, FAS started a youth revolution under new coach Ruben Guevara, these players will form the backbone for the upcoming dynasty to come, these include Eliseo Quintanilla, Gilberto Murgas, Marvin Gonzalez, Gerardo Burgos, Rafael Tobar, Jaime Gómez and Juan Granados. Along with experienced players such as William Osorio, Salvador Alfaro, Ricardo Cuellar, Carlos Linares and foreigner players Urguayans Pablo Quiñones and Alejandro Soler, Brazilian Alessandro Moresche and Argenitnian Alejandro de la Cruz and Peruvian Antonio Serrano, they reached the final but were defeated by archrivals C.D. Aguila 2–1.

Towards end of the 2001 Apertura season, FAS hired Peruvian Agustin Castillo although they just missed the finals, FAS had added the final pieces and they went on to win back to back titles winning the 2002 Apertura and 2002 Clausura, defeating Alianza F.C. 4-0 and San Salvador F.C. 3-1 respectively, with the youth injected a year ago, and adding important players such as Honduran William Reyes, Colombian Victor Mafla, Costa Rican Rolando Corella, William Machón, Jorge Rodríguez, Luis Contreras, Carlos Menjivar, Victor Velasquez, Daniel Sagastizado, Juan Carlos Padilla, Cristian Álvarez, Luis Castro, Ernesto Gochez, Juan Carlos Panameño and Alfredo Pacheco

They failed to win three titles in a row, after losing the 2003 Clausura semi finals match against Luis Angel Firpo in penalties. However they were able to win 14th title and 3rd title in 3 years, defeating their archrival C.D. Aguila in penalties.

2010s to present
After a small drought, On 20 December 2009 FAS won their 19th title defeating arch rival Aguila 3-2 thanks to goals for Josué Flores, Juan Carlos Moscoso and own goal by Mexican Arturo Albarrán.
Its been more than a decade since FAS last won a championships, despite making five different finals including Clausura 2011 (Falling against Alianza), Clausura 2013 (Firpo), Apertura 2013 (Isidro Metapan), Apertura 2015 (Alianza) and Apertura 2019 (Alianza). 

FAS progressed to the final in December 2019, where they faced the Alianza for the third time in decade; FAS was ultimately defeated in Alianza by a score of 1–0.

FAS won the Clausura 2021 Championship defeating (Alianza) on penalty shootout, after a 1-1 Draw in regular time, winning the club the 18th title.

On 15 April 2022, FAS announced that they had been acquired by American ownership group AMG Sports
 
Following the acquisition of the club, FAS hired Ecuadorian Octavio Zambrano to manage the team. This was followed by the signings of players such as Mexican Luis Ángel Mendoza, Colombians Yílmar Filigrana and Juan Camilo Salazar, local players Rubén Marroquín, Marvin Marquez and Roberto Dominguez. This led to FAS winning the 2022 Apertura title, defeating first time finalist Jocoro 2–0, thanks to goals from Rudy Clavel and Yílmar Filigrana.

Stadium
 Finca Modelo; Santa Ana (1947–62), (1989/1990)
 Estadio Cuscatlán; San Salvador (2010, 2012, 2014) games in the CONCACAF Champions League
 Estadio Nacional Flor Blanca; San Salvador (TBD) International games prior to the building of Estadio Cuscatlan
 Estadio Simeón Magaña; Ahuachapán (2019) games played while renovations are being done at Estadio Oscar Quiteno
Estadio Oscar Quiteño; Santa Ana (1963–present)

The team plays its home games in the 17,500 capacity all-seater Estadio Oscar Quiteño, in Santa Ana.
The stadium is named after Oscar Quiteño, a goalkeeper of FAS who died after an accident on the soccer pitch.
Previously the team played at Finca Modelo, where they had played their home matches from 1947 until the end of the 1962 season. The stadium was located in Santa Ana. The team's headquarters are located in TBD.

Sponsorship
Companies that FAS currently has sponsorship deals for 2023-24 season includes:

 Joma – Official Kit Suppliers
 Tigo – Official sponsors
 Cerveza Pilsener – Official sponsors
 Cementos Fortaleza – Official sponsors
 Transporte Sol– Official sponsors
 Canal 4 – Official sponsors
 AGM Sport INC – Official sponsors
 Hospital Cader – Official sponsors

Crest
FAS's crest has changed several times. Originally it consisted of the stylised letters F, A, S, which were woven into one symbol. The original crest was blue.

The FAS logo has a red, blue and white colour scheme. It has CD FAS written on the top and Santa Ana, El Salvador written on the bottom of the white ring enclosing a tiger.

Colours and Past kits

Originally the club colours were blue and yellow, this was used until 1962 where the colours were changed to an all black outfit. However, with a new owners and stadium the colours were update to the colors used and known today to be associated with FAS blue and Red shirts, white shorts and red socks with blue stripes.

Honours
FAS is historically the most successful team in El Salvador football, as they have won the most championships with nineteen. They are also one of El Salvador's most successful team in international competitions, having won one CONCACAF Tournament. FAS is one of only three clubs to have won the CONCACAF Champions' Cup.

Domestic honours

League
 Primera División de Fútbol de El Salvador and predecessors 
 Champions (19): 1951–1952, 1953–1954, 1957–1958, 1961–1962, 1962, 1977–1978, 1978–1979, 1981, 1984, 1994–1995, 1995–1996, Clausura 2002, Apertura 2002, Apertura 2003, Apertura 2004, Clausura 2005, Apertura 2009, Clausura 2021, Apertura 2022.

Minor Cups
 American Airlines Cup 
 Champions (1) : 2002
 Copa Salvadorean Classic Soccer Challenge 
 Runners up (1) : 2014
 EDESSA Independence Cup 
 Runners up (1) : 2014

International honours

CONCACAF
 CONCACAF Champions' Cup and predecessors 
 Champions (1) : 1979
 Copa Interamericana 
 Runners up (1) : 1979
 UNCAF Club Championship 
 Third place (1) : 1980

Retired numbers
 10 –  Jorge "Mágico" González, Forward (1977–82, 1991–99)

Players

Current squad
As of 5 February 2023

Out on loan

In

Out

Players with dual citizenship
   Guillermo Stradella
   Cristian Gil

Reserve Category Football
As for January 2022

Coaching staff
As for December 2022

Management
As of December, 2022

Presidential history

Notable players

Team captains

Club records

David Cabrera is the all-time leading goalscorer for FAS, with 242—since joining the club in 1966. Williams Reyes, who is the all-time topscorer in Clausura-Apertura format for FAS comes in second in all competitions with 139. Omar Muraco is the club's highest scorer in a single season with 39 goals in 00 appearances in the 1957-58 season. The most goals scored by a player in a single match is 6, which is also an Salvadoran record. This was achieved by David Cabrera in a game against UES in the 1980 season.
The biggest victory recorded by FAS was 11–0 against Independiente, Primera División, 3 May 1959. FAS' heaviest championship defeats came during the 1989 season: It was against Alianza in 1989 (1–7).

 FAS has the national record of most national titles won with 19
 First victory for FAS 2–1 Juventud Olimpica Sept 19, 1948
 Largest victory was against Independiente 11–0 3 May 1959
 Largest defeat was 1–7 against Alianza F.C. 29 October 1989 at Estadio Cuscatlán. Raúl Toro (4), César Pineda (2) and Jaime Rodríguez scored for Alianza. Jorge Ábrego scored the only goal for FAS.
 Most goal by any national team with 3,000 goal as of 4 July 2009 
 Most goals scored by a player in one season: Omar Muraco 39 goals in 1957-58

Historical Matches

Head coaches of FAS

FAS has had various coaches since its formation in 1947. Agustín Castillo has served three terms as head coach. Ricardo Mena Laguán, Ruben Guevara and Victor Manuel Ochoa served two terms as head coach. Agustin Castillo was the club's most successful coach, having won five Primera División titles, following closely is Jose Eugenio Castro Chepito, who won two Primera titles, and one CONCACAF Champions' Cup 1979, and Victor Manuel Ochoa & Saul Lorenzo Rivero won two Primera titles.

Other departments

Football

Reserve team
The reserve team serves mainly as the final stepping stone for promising young players under the age of 21 before being promoted to the main team. The second team is coached by Efren Marenco. the team played in the Primera División Reserves, their greatest successes were winning the Reserve championships in Clausura 2017, Apertura 2017, Clausura 2019.

Junior teams
The youth team (under 17 and under 15) has produced some of El Salvador's top football players, including TBD and TBD.

Women's team
The women's first team, which is led by head coach Cristian Zañas, features several members of the El Salvador national ladies team. Their greatest successes was  winning the 2021 Clausura 3-2 penalties.

Other sports
FAS has other departments for a variety of sports.

Basketball
FAS Denver Básquetbol Club was founded in 2015 and play Liga Mayor de Baloncesto (LMB) which is the highest level in El Salvador league tier. the club is led by head coach TBD, the club features several key members including Puerto Rican Bryan Vásquez and TBD. Their greatest successes were winning the 2015 Clausura

Famous players such as venzeualn Jonathan José Figuera

Baseball
FAS Béisbol Club was founded in 2016 and play Liga Nacional de Béisbol (LNB)  which is the highest level in El Salvador league tier. the club is led by head coach Venezuelan Jesús Cartagena, the club features several key members including Puerto Rican Bryan Vásquez and TBD. Their greatest successes were reaching the TBD

Volleyball
FAS Voleibol Club was founded in 2016 and play  Campeonaro Nacional which is the highest level in El Salvador league tier. the club is led by head coach TBD, the club features several key members including TBD and TBD. Their greatest successes were reaching the TBD

References

Sources

External links
 Twitter site

 
Association football clubs established in 1947
Football clubs in El Salvador
1947 establishments in El Salvador
Santa Ana, El Salvador
F